Girls, Beware! (German: Mädchen, hütet Euch!) is a 1928 German silent drama film directed by Valy Arnheim and starring Gritta Ley, Egon von Jordan and Hanni Weisse.

The film's sets were designed by the art director August Rinaldi.

Cast
 Gritta Ley 
 Egon von Jordan 
 Hanni Weisse
 Valy Arnheim 
 Eugen Burg 
 Toni Ebärg 
 Olga Engl 
 Rudolf Lettinger 
 Iwa Wanja

References

Bibliography
 Hans-Jürgen Lange. Otto Rahn und die Suche nach dem Gral: Biografie und Quellen. Arun, 1999.

External links

1928 films
Films of the Weimar Republic
German silent feature films
Films directed by Valy Arnheim
1928 drama films
German drama films
German black-and-white films
Silent drama films
1920s German films
1920s German-language films